Kirriemuir Thistle Football Club are a Scottish junior football club based in Kirriemuir, Angus. Their home ground is Westview Park.

Up until the end of the 2005–06 season, the club played in Tayside Division One of the Scottish Junior Football Association's East Region. They had previously finished as champions of the previous Tayside Junior Football League system once, in 1974.

The SJFA restructured prior to the 2006–07 season, and Kirriemuir found themselves in the twelve-team East Region, North Division. They finished eighth in their first season in the division.

A co-management duo of Chris Kettles and Ralph Brand were appointed in September 2017, with Kettles assuming sole charge after Brand stepped down in January 2018.

on 14 June 2021, Darren Scott has left the club.

Non-playing staff

Manager - Darren Scott 
Coach - Kevin McNaughton 
Coach - Ross Grant

References

External links
Club website

Football clubs in Scotland
Scottish Junior Football Association clubs
Association football clubs established in 1921
Football clubs in Angus, Scotland
1921 establishments in Scotland
Kirriemuir